James Humphreys (born 1967) is a political analyst and author. He grew up in Cambridgeshire and studied Social History at Cambridge University.

Civil service and political career
Humphreys worked as a civil servant, negotiating environmental legislation with the European Union and later becoming Head of Corporate Communications at the Prime Minister's Office. He was Professor of Government at City University London from 2005 to 2009.

He is a member of the Green Party and became chair of the party in 2008. He stood for election in Islington South and Finsbury in the 2005 and 2010 general elections and for Islington Council also in 2010. He is an adviser to the Green Party Member of Parliament Caroline Lucas.

He works as a political consultant, for the firm Woodnewton, and is a trustee of the Woodland Trust.

Author
Humphreys is the author of Negotiating in the European Union: How to Make the Brussels Machine Work for You.

Quite separately, Humphreys has pursued a career as writer of popular fiction. Starting with Sleeping Partner in 2000, he received praise from Colin Dexter, who stated that the book was: "[a] splendid debut in crime fiction - more please, Mr Humphreys".

Humphreys wrote Riptide in 2001, which The Observer said to be "an accomplished, intriguing story". In 2010, he published a book of ghost stories, called The Mincer and Other Stories to raise funds for the Woodland Trust.

References

1967 births
Living people
Green Party of England and Wales parliamentary candidates
English political writers
English crime fiction writers
English male novelists
English male non-fiction writers